Kostretsy may refer to:

Kostretsy, Pskov Oblast, a village in Pskov Oblast, Russia
Kostretsy, Tver Oblast, a village in Tver Oblast, Russia